Lekhayude Maranam Oru Flashback is a 1983 Malayalam-language film by K. G. George. The film was controversial because of the protagonist's similarities to the actress Shoba, whose suicide was highly publicized. In his biography, even though KG George admits that his inspiration to make the movie was indeed the suicide of Shobha, he says that more importantly it was his long-time dream to make a cinema about 'cinema', which had never been tried before in the Malayalam industry at the time.

The film was a commercial success. Although it did not receive any of the Kerala state Film awards, it garnered widespread critical acclaim and received awards outside Kerala. It was screened at several movie festivals namely the International Movie festival under the Indian Panorama division held in Bombay and also at the London Film Festival.

Plot 
A poor Malayali family reaches Madras to try their luck in the film industry with their daughter Shantamma. She slowly starts climbing the ladder of success and becomes popular actress Lekha. At the peak of her career she commits suicide by hanging herself. The film recounts events that leads to her suicide, including a stint as a prostitute succumbing to the pressure from her parents for the lust of quick money and her unsuccessful love affair with a director.

Cast 
Nalini as Lekha (Voice By Lisy)
Bharath Gopi as Suresh Babu
Mammootty as Prem Sagar
Sharada as Geetha
Meenakumari
Shubha as Lekha's Mother
John Varghese as Lekha's Father
Mohan Jose as Lekha's uncle
Thodupuzha Vasanthi
Ramu
Thilakan
Nedumudi Venu
Venu Nagavally
Sreenivasan as Movie Director
Bharathan - cameo appearance

Soundtrack 
The music was composed by M. B. Sreenivasan and the lyrics were written by O. N. V. Kurup.

References

External links 
 

1983 films
1980s Malayalam-language films
Indian films based on actual events
Films directed by K. G. George
Films scored by M. B. Sreenivasan